Oxfam is the largest retailer of second hand books in Europe, selling around 12 million per year. Most of Oxfam's 750 charity shops around the UK sell books, and around 100 are specialist bookshops or book and music shops. A typical Oxfam bookshop will have around 50 volunteers, as well as a small number of full-time staff. The charity makes around £1.6 million each month from book sales.

Books are donated directly to shops by the public, or through Oxfam "book banks" in convenient locations around the country. The profits of the book sales support the work of Oxfam.

Following a revival in fortunes of the new and second-hand book industry at the end of the 1990s, Oxfam began to rapidly expand its specialist bookshops. By 2003 it had 60 brightly lit and modern bookshops aiming to shake off the old 'dank and dusty' image. Modern Oxfam bookshops typically boast professional fittings and a wide range of stock, including recent novels, specialist textbooks and out-of-print curios.

Small bookshops have complained that Oxfam receives unfair advantages in the form of favourable tax rates and cheaper waste disposal, amongst other things. In response to these criticisms, Oxfam has said that much of the damage to small book retailers has come from supermarkets and online retailers, particularly Tesco and Amazon.

France has two Oxfam bookshops in Paris as well as in Strasbourg and Lille. In Belgium, there are Oxfam bookshops in Brussels (Ixelles and Uccle), Liège, Namur, Antwerp, Ghent, Leuven, Kortrijk and Hasselt.

There is one Oxfam bookshop in Australia, in the city of Adelaide, run by about 130 volunteers.

See also
 Book trade in the United Kingdom
 Books in the United Kingdom

References

External links
 Oxfam bookshops website

Oxfam
Bookshops of the United Kingdom
Used bookstores
Bookstores established in the 20th century
Charity shops
Bookshops in London